In social sciences, a cross-cutting cleavage exists when groups on  one cleavage overlap among groups on another cleavage.  "Cleavages" may include racial, political, religious divisions in society. Formally, members of a group j on a given cleavage x belong to groups on a second cleavage y with members of other groups k, l, m, etc. from the first cleavage x. For example, if a society contained two ethnic groups that had equal proportions of rich and poor it would be cross-cutting. While the concept may have been around since antiquity the formalizing of it originated with James Madison in  The Federalist, Number 10. Robert A. Dahl built a theory of Pluralist democracy which is a direct descendant of Madison's cross-cutting cleavages. The term's antonym is reinforcing cleavages", which would be the case of one of the ethnic groups being all rich and the other all poor. The term originates from Simmel (1908) in his work Soziologie.

Definition
In social sciences, a cross-cutting cleavage exists when groups on  one cleavage overlap among groups on another cleavage. "Cleavages" may include racial, political, religious divisions in society. Formally, members of a group j on a given cleavage x belong to groups on a second cleavage y with members of other groups k, l, m, etc. from the first cleavage x. For example, if a society contained two ethnic groups that had equal proportions of rich and poor it would be cross-cutting. 
The term's antonym is "reinforcing cleavages", which would be the case of one of the ethnic groups being all rich and the other all poor. The term originates from Simmel (1908) in his work Soziologie.

History
Anthropologists used the term heavily in the first few decades of the 20th century, as they brought back descriptions of non-Western societies throughout Asia and Africa.

Sociologists have used the term, especially in the sub-field of Macro Sociology. Peter Blau's work is the most well-known.

The concept of cross-cutting cleavages is perhaps most heavily used in the field of Political Science. Cross-cutting cleavages were originally suggested as a mechanism for political stability, as no group can align all its members along a uniform cleavage-based platform, but rather has to appeal to members of the group that are spread throughout the groups created by other cleavages. 
The most in-depth discussion of this process is that by Seymour Martin Lipset in his 1960 book Political Man.  

Stein Rokkan wrote a classic essay on crosscutting cleavages in Norway. 

Cross-cutting theory was applied to such topics as social order, political violence, voting behaviour, political organization and democratic stability, for example Truman's The Governmental Process, Dahl's A Preface to Democratic Theory, among others.  Around the same time, several scholars (including Lipset himself) suggested ways to measure the concept, the best-known being Rae and Taylor's in their 1970 book The Analysis of Political Cleavages. Due to data limitations, these theories were generally left untested for a couple of decades.

Diana Mutz revived the concept in the early 2000s, looking at political participation and democratic theory using survey data in the US and other Western European democracies.

Several scholars have written on how cross-cutting cleavages relates to ethnic voting, civil war, ethnic censuses (Lieberman and Singh 2012) and economic growth (Selway 2011).  

Selway (2011) suggested a new measure for crosscutting cleavages and published a crossnational dataset on crosscutting cleavages among several dimensions (ethnicity, class, geography and religion).

Desmet, Ortuño-Ortín and Wacziarg (2017), in the American Economic Review, derive and discuss several measures of cross-cuttingness and compute them using data on ethnic identity and cultural values.

See also
Federalist No. 10
Cleavage (politics)
Intersectionality

References 

Intersectionality
Political terminology